WRKI (95.1 FM, "I-95") is a commercial radio station licensed to Brookfield, Connecticut, serving Fairfield, Litchfield and New Haven Counties in Connecticut. From its tower at more than 1200 feet above sea level (HAAT:194 m./674 ft.) WRKI's 29,500-watt signal can be heard in such large Connecticut cities as Bridgeport, Danbury, Stamford and New Haven.

The station is owned by Townsquare Media and it carries a classic rock radio format.  The studios and offices are located on Federal Road (U.S. Route 202) in Brookfield; the station's transmitter is on Carmen Hill Road, also in Brookfield.

History

Top 40 WINE-FM
On July 14, 1957, the station signed on as WGHF.  It was owned by the Eastern Broadcasting System.  Sister station WINE 940 AM signed on in 1963 as a simulcast of WGHF. In 1970, the FM station's call sign was changed to WINE-FM.

WINE-AM-FM aired a popular contemporary format, playing the Top 40 hits of the day.  Because WINE was an AM daytimer, required to sign off at sunset, WINE-FM continued the Top 40 sound into the night when WINE 940 was off the air.

Album rock I-95
WINE-FM stopped simulcasting the AM station at the end of 1976.  At 6:00 p.m. on December 24, 1976, it switched to an album-oriented rock format.  The first song played was "The Bitch Is Back" by Elton John. It switched its call letters to WRKI, using the name of a major interstate highway in its listening area, I-95.

The station's original slogan was "Fairfield County's Best Rock."  In 1982 the station had a brief detour into modern rock and New Wave music as "The Rock Of The 80s" but soon returned to its album rock sound. The station has also been known as "The Non-Stop Rock Station", "Connecticut's Best Rock & Roll", "Connecticut's Rock & Roll Favorites", "Real Rock" and "Danbury's Rock Station" but has most consistently been and currently known as "The Home Of Rock 'n' Roll."

WRKI and 940 WINE were acquired by Cumulus Media in 2002.  Cumulus is one of the largest owners of radio stations in the U.S.

Townsquare ownership
On August 30, 2013, a deal was announced in which Townsquare Media would acquire 53 Cumulus Media stations, including WRKI and WINE, for $238 million. The deal was part of Cumulus Media's acquisition of Dial Global. Townsquare Media and Dial Global are both controlled by Oaktree Capital Management.  The sale to Townsquare Media was completed on November 14, 2013.

Upon Townsquare taking control of WRKI, the new owner moved the station to classic rock. Unlike several Townsquare radio stations, WRKI kept most of the station's local disc jockeys.

References

External links
 

Mass media in Fairfield County, Connecticut
RKI
Classic rock radio stations in the United States
Radio stations established in 1957
1957 establishments in Connecticut
Townsquare Media radio stations